Shaykh al-Hadid (also spelled Sheikh Hadid, Sheikh El-Hadid) is a town in northern Syria, administratively part of the Afrin District of the Aleppo Governorate, located northwest of Aleppo near the border with Turkey. Nearby localities include Kafr Safra to the south and Darmashkanli to the northeast. According to the Syria Central Bureau of Statistics (CBS), Shaykh al-Hadid had a population of 5,063 in the 2004 census. On March 4, 2018, the town came under the control of the Syrian National Army.

References

Populated places in Afrin District
Towns in Aleppo Governorate
Kurdish communities in Syria